Kim Na-hyun (Hangul: , born January 3, 2000) is a South Korean figure skater. She is the 2016 CS Lombardia Trophy silver medalist and has finished in the top ten at two ISU Championships.

Career

Early career 
Kim began learning to skate in 2006. Her ISU Junior Grand Prix (JGP) debut came in August 2013. After placing fifth in Riga, Latvia, she had the same result the following month in Gdańsk, Poland. Ranked 14th in the short program, she qualified to the free skate at the 2014 World Junior Championships in Sofia, Bulgaria, and went on to finish tenth overall.

Kim's first senior international was the 2016 Four Continents Championships in Taipei, Taiwan; she finished 9th after ranking 8th in both segments.

2016–17 season 
In September 2016, Kim won the silver medal at a Challenger Series event, the Lombardia Trophy in Bergamo, Italy. Making her Grand Prix debut, Kim placed 8th at the 2016 Skate Canada International in late October.

In January 2017, she was awarded the bronze medal at the South Korean Championships. At the 2017 Four Continents Championships in Gangneung, South Korea, she placed 17th in the short program but withdrew before the next segment. She had inflammation in both ankles and pain in her thigh. A week later, she decided to withdraw from the 2017 World Championships.

Programs

Competitive highlights 
GP: Grand Prix; CS: Challenger Series; JGP: Junior Grand Prix

Detailed results

Senior

Junior 

 Personal bests highlighted in bold.

References 

 2014 South Korean Figure Skating Championships Results: 1st Day 2nd Day 3rd Day

External links 
 
 
 Kim Na-hyun at Tracings.net

2000 births
South Korean female single skaters
Living people
Figure skaters from Seoul
Figure skaters at the 2017 Asian Winter Games
Competitors at the 2019 Winter Universiade